Bascom Corner is an unincorporated community in Cass Township, Ohio County, in the U.S. state of Indiana.

History
The community's name honors a family of settlers.

Geography

References

Unincorporated communities in Ohio County, Indiana
Unincorporated communities in Indiana